Torrey Pines Golf Course is a 36-hole municipal golf facility on the west coast of the United States, owned by the city of San Diego, California. It sits on the coastal cliffs overlooking the Pacific Ocean in the community of La Jolla, just south of Torrey Pines State Reserve. Opened in 1957, it was built on the site of Camp Callan, a U.S. Army installation during World War II. 

Torrey Pines has two 18-hole golf courses, North and South, both designed by William Francis Bell (son of noted course architect William P. Bell). The South Course was redesigned by Rees Jones in 2001, and is now  in length from the back tees with par at 72. The North Course was redesigned by Tom Weiskopf in 2016, switching the nines so that the famous ocean views are now enjoyed at the end of the round.

Since the late 1960s, Torrey Pines has hosted the PGA Tour's Farmers Insurance Open, originally known as the San Diego Open. During those early editions at Torrey Pines, the course length was under . Held annually in January or February, the tournament uses both courses for the first two rounds and the South Course for the final two rounds; it was held January 26–29 in 2022 and won by Luke List.

The South Course has hosted two U.S. Opens: Tiger Woods won in sudden-death in 2008 after an 18-hole playoff against Rocco Mediate, and Jon Rahm won in 2021. Torrey Pines hosts the San Diego City Amateur Golf Championships every June, and the Junior World Golf Championships every July.

Much like Bethpage Black (on Long Island, New York), Torrey Pines has moved their tee time reservation to an online booking system.  However, on weekends and major holidays, individuals can still walk on the North course back nine by waiting in line for a first-come, first-served tee times that begin with the first tee time of the day for the North course and lasting until 7:30 a.m.

The course is named for the Torrey Pine, a rare tree that grows in the wild only along this local stretch of the coastline in San Diego County and on Santa Rosa Island. The logo (illustrated: right) features a salt pruned representation of the tree.

2008 U.S. Open
Tiger Woods won the 2008 U.S. Open over Rocco Mediate in a 19-hole Monday playoff. After completing the 18-hole playoff on the South Course tied at even par 71, they went to sudden-death on the 91st hole, played on the par-4 7th hole. Mediate had trouble off of the tee and made bogey, while Woods made par to gain his third U.S. Open and fourteenth career major title, which put him just four behind Jack Nicklaus. He birdied the final hole on Sunday to force the playoff and again on Monday to extend it. Woods, age 32, won while playing with a stress fracture and torn ACL; this was his last major title until 2019.

Popular culture
Torrey Pines is a featured golf course in the Links: The Challenge of Golf (1990), Microsoft Golf 2.0 (1995), Tiger Woods PGA Tour 2003, Tiger Woods PGA Tour 10, and Tiger Woods PGA Tour 13.

Scott Peterson, previously on death row for the murder of his wife Laci, was arrested in the parking lot of Torrey Pines in

Major tournaments hosted

^

North Course 
The North Course is shorter (from the men's tees) and rated less difficult than the South Course.  All measurements made in yards.

South Course 

At , the South Course is the longest course played in a regular PGA Tour event.

References

External links
 Torrey Pines Golf Course official site
 C.Michael Hogan (2008) "Torrey Pine: Pinus torreyana", Globaltwitcher, ed. N. Stromberg 
 Satellite images of Torrey Pines Golf Course
 Torrey Pines Municipal Golf Club

Golf clubs and courses in California
La Jolla, San Diego
Sports venues in San Diego
Golf clubs and courses designed by Rees Jones
Sports venues completed in 1957
1957 establishments in California